Eleanor is a female given name.

Eleanor, Elenore, Elinor, Elinore, Ellinore, Elynor or variations thereof may also refer to:

Places
Lake Eleanor, a reservoir in Yosemite National Park, California
Eleanor, Iowa, an unincorporated community
Eleanor, Illinois, an unincorporated community
Ellinor, Kansas, an unincorporated community
Eleanor, West Virginia, a town
2650 Elinor, an asteroid

Ships
, a United States Navy patrol boat in commission from 1917 to 1918
PS Eleanor (1873), a paddle steamer cargo vessel operated by the London and North Western Railway from 1873 to 1881
PS Eleanor (1881), a paddle steamer cargo vessel operated by the London and North Western Railway from 1881 to 1902
Eleanor (sloop), a racing sloop built in 1903
Eleanor, one of the three tea ships boarded in the Boston Tea Party

Other uses
"Eleanor Put Your Boots On", a song by Franz Ferdinand
"Eleanor Rigby", a song by The Beatles
"Elenore", a 1968 song by The Turtles
Eleanor (book), a biography of Eleanor Roosevelt's childhood by Barbara Cooney
Eleanor (novel), a novel by Mary Augusta Ward
Eleanor (automobile), codename for the cars seen in the film Gone in 60 Seconds
Eleanor (horse) (1798–c. 1824), British Thoroughbred and the first female horse to win the Epsom Derby 
Elanor, the name of a flower in J.R.R. Tolkien's fantasy work Lord of the Rings
"Eleonora" (short story), a short story by Edgar Allan Poe
"Elinor", a song from the album of the same name by Zohar Argov
"Elinor", a song by Basshunter, 2013
"Lady Eleanor", 1972 song by Lindisfarne

See also
Eleanor cross, crosses erected between 1291 and 1294 by King Edward I of England in memory of his wife, Eleanor of Castile
Tropical Storm Eleanor, name used for several tropical cyclones 
 
 
 
 
 
Ellie (disambiguation)
Leonora (disambiguation)